The Black River is a  blackwater river in South Carolina in the United States. It courses through Sumter, Clarendon, and Williamsburg counties before merging with the Great Pee Dee River in Georgetown County.  The river was called the Wee Nee by the Native Americans who once inhabited the area. In June 2001, a 75-mile segment of the river was designated a State Scenic River.

See also
List of South Carolina rivers
Mansfield Plantation

References

Rivers of South Carolina
Tributaries of the Pee Dee River
Rivers of Williamsburg County, South Carolina
Rivers of Georgetown County, South Carolina
Rivers of Clarendon County, South Carolina
Rivers of Sumter County, South Carolina
Rivers of Lee County, South Carolina